Events in 1999 in Japanese television.

Debuts

Ongoing shows
Music Fair, music (1964–present)
Mito Kōmon, jidaigeki (1969-2011)
Sazae-san, anime (1969–present)
FNS Music Festival, music (1974-present)
Panel Quiz Attack 25, game show (1975–present)
Doraemon, anime (1979-2005)
Soreike! Anpanman, anime (1988-present)
Downtown no Gaki no Tsukai ya Arahende!!, game show (1989–present)
Crayon Shin-chan, anime (1992-present)
Shima Shima Tora no Shimajirō, anime (1993-2008)
Nintama Rantarō, anime (1993–present)
Chibi Maruko-chan, anime (1995-present)
Kochira Katsushika-ku Kameari Kōen-mae Hashutsujo, anime (1996-2004)
Detective Conan, anime (1996–present)
SASUKE, sports (1997-present)
Ojarumaru, anime (1998-present)
Pocket Monsters, anime (1998-2002)

Hiatus

Returning

Endings

See also
1999 in anime
List of Japanese television dramas
1999 in Japan
List of Japanese films of 1999

References